Eupheme , also Jupiter LX, originally known as , is an outer natural satellite of Jupiter, 2 km in diameter.

Discovery
It was discovered by a team of astronomers from the University of Hawaii led by Scott S. Sheppard in 2003. The moon was lost following its discovery in 2003. It was recovered in 2017 and given its permanent designation that year.

Name
It was named in 2019 after Eupheme, the ancient Greek spirit of words of good omen, praise, acclaims, shouts of triumph, and applause, the daughter of Hephaestus and Aglaea and granddaughter of Zeus. The name was suggested by Twitter user Lunartic (@iamalunartic) in a naming contest held by the Carnegie Institute on the social network who concurrently helped in naming another Jovian moon Philophrosyne.

Orbit
Eupheme orbits Jupiter at an average distance of 19,622 Mm in 628.06 days, at an inclination of 146° to the ecliptic (146° to Jupiter's equator), in a retrograde direction and with an eccentricity of 0.2507. It belongs to the Ananke group, retrograde irregular moons that orbit Jupiter between 19.3 and 22.7 Gm, at inclinations of roughly 150°.

References

Ananke group
Moons of Jupiter
Irregular satellites
Astronomical objects discovered in 2003
Discoveries by Scott S. Sheppard
Moons with a retrograde orbit